Sweetwaters Music Festival was a series of events held between 1980 and 1999, at venues such as a farm in Ngāruawāhia, then further north on a farm near Pukekawa, and finally at South Auckland, New Zealand.

Events

1980 - Ngāruawāhia
1981 - Ngāruawāhia
1982 - Pukekawa
1983 - Pukekawa
1984 - Pukekawa
1999 - South Auckland

A related event, Sweetwaters South, was held in Christchurch in 1984

Music
Elvis Costello, Bryan Ferry, Roxy Music,Ultravox, Dragon, Mi-Sex, Split Enz, Jo Jo Zep, Cold Chisel, The Tigers, Midge Marsden, Th' Dudes, The Crocodiles, UB40, The Wiggles.

1999 - The festival in 1999 was the largest festival event ever held in New Zealand, with a number of stages representing many genres/cultures of music, theatre, dance, comedy, and children's entertainment. The line-up - with a few exceptions and additions, shown on the back of the official T-shirt was as follows:

Main Stage:
Rose Bayonet, UB40, Run DMC, Elvis Costello (with Steve Nieve), The Finn Brothers, The Melvins, Dogstar (Keanu Reeves), Grant Lee Buffalo, Paul Kelly, Ed Kuepper, The Stranglers, Headless Chickens, Cowboy Junkies, Donovan, Chris Starling, Pere Ubu, Mark Seymour, James Reyne, Men at Work, Colin Hay, Renee Geyer.

Sweetwaters Stage:
Pitch Black, Lost Tribe, Head Like a Hole, Shona Laing, Spelling Mistakes, Moizna, Boom, Jordan Reyne, Eye TV, Southside Of Bombay, Aka Brown, Dei Hamo, Warratahs, The New Loungehead, Emma Paki, Ma-V-Elle, Shihad, Dead Flowers, The Clean, Hello 
Sailor, Paul Ubana Jones, Karen Hunter & Love Mussel, Chris Knox, Tadpole, Ardijah, Salmonella Dub, Stereo Bus.

H2Go Dance Tent:
Paul van Dyk, The Mad Professor, Joachim, Deep Obsession, Mu, Nonplace Urban Field, International Observer, Nathan Haines, Halogen Girl, Joost with Subware, Tim, Baitercell, No Added Imports, Ultravenous, Sam Hill, Soane, Anbee, Soundboy, Mikey Havoc, Greg Churchill, Kinesis, Bevan Keys & Peter Urlich, Chrissy Jay, MC Trix, Clarkee, Caustic, Roger Perry, Presha & 48 Sonic, Dean Webb, Detour, Downtown Brown & The Nomad, 
Rob Warner, React, Smokers Delight featuring Stinky Jim, Drumtalk.
New Zealand Music Stage:
Bird and Truck Collision, Bailterspace, Upper Hutt Posse, The Pet Rocks, Epsilon Blue, Apollo Deluxe, Sticky Filth, Peter Jefferies & Anita Anker, Winterland, Fur Patrol, Fungi, D-Funkt, Handsome Geoffrey, Vaawise, 3 the Hard Way, Axemen, Caneslide, Cabbage Bomber, Herbs, The Hollow Grinders, Baitercell, Spazmatron, No Thrills, Big Blue Blanket, Kitsch, Benzine, Iwi, The Managers, Ermehn, The Hammerdown Gospel Experience, Hawaii Five-O, Trinket, Crash, Mary, Trucker, Footsouljahs.

Jazz, Blues and Roots Stage:
The Midge Marsden Band with Bullfrog Rata, Shayn Wills, Red 
House Rockers, Marg Layton, Twelve Tribes of Israel, Dan Hicks and The Acoustic Warriors, Chris Smither, Amazing Rhythm Aces, Saffire, D.I.G., Gumbo Fever, Bob Hall, Nairobi Trio, Jews Brothers, Rachel Buchanan, Wayne Mason Band, Glen Moffatt Band, Windy City Strugglers, NZ Blues Brothers Revue, Kokomo Blues, Mark Hekes' Ponsonby Express, The Hammond Gamble Blues Band, The Donna Dean Band, Alligators, First Ladies of Jazz, Chris Thompson, Witch, 
AJ Bell & The Sister Lovers.

Aerial Railway Stage:
Graduate Dancers, Witches on Heat, Big Belly Womyn, Wendy Medicine Isis, The Muse, Morag Magnolia Brownlie, Toro Pikopiko Puppet Theatre, Auckland Contemporary Ballet Company, Ahurangi, Nga Moemoea a te Rangatahi, Tonihi & Ahiwai, Grant Bridger and 
Matthew Brown, Michelle Rounds and Get Funked, Matthew 
Robertson, Saama Sugar Licks, Maree Sheehan and Team, Sparkle,
Silent State, Katie Soljak, Sufi Whirling, Trash to Fashion, The Auckland Sinfonietta, The Time Bandits, Mahinarangi Tocker, Rohan Hunt, Touch Compass, Touched by the Sea, Henrietta Ford Stagecoach, Ginger & Sarah, Linn Lorkin & Hershal, Jeanine Clarkin, Marama, Manic Opera, 
Francis Maxino, Mika, Black Grace, The Bluehouse, Tenzin Choegyal, Drumdrag, The Dead Poets, Feic, Mr Fungus, Haemoglobin, Heaven Bent Gospel Choir, Miz Ima Starr, Nikau, Nautipuss, Pacific Sisters, Pacific Soul Beat, Quantum Flux, Riqi & Friends, The Rainmakers, Surkuy, Luke Devery, The Invisible Circus, Thaumatology Visual Associates, Sahu Drum Society, Capoeira, Suntoi.

Children's Fair:
Bananas in Pyjamas, The Wiggles, Love to Sing Children's Choir, 
The Roadies Theatre Co., The Aunties, U*Me*Us, Kahurangi Maori Dance Theatre, Jennifer's Garden, Bringwonder, Tanya Batt, Te Reo Kori, The Green Bus Co., Morag Brownlie, Fairy Frolics, Jest-A-Mo, Mihinga Naden.

Bird & Truck Collision, Mahinarangi Tocker

Film and television
Radio With Pictures: Sweetwaters Festival, Television New Zealand, 1980
Reporter: Dylan Taite

Books
 Keighley, Daniel. Sweetwaters: The Untold Story. Reviewed by Simon Sweetman: "Daniel Keighley was the man behind the financial disaster that was Sweetwaters ’99. He was charged with fraud and jailed and Sweetwaters: The Untold Story is his account of what went wrong. Billed as an autobiography."

See also
New Zealand music festivals

References

External links
 AudioCulture story Pt.1
 AudioCulture story Pt.2
 Sweetwaters: The Untold Story
 History of New Zealand rock music festivals (NZHistory.net.nz)
 New Zealand University Days - Sweetwater Music Festival

Music festivals established in 1980
Sweetwaters
1980 establishments in New Zealand